The settlement of Broad Bay is located on the Otago Harbour coast of Otago Peninsula, in the South Island of New Zealand. It is administered as part of the city of Dunedin, and is technically a suburb of that city, though its isolation and semi-rural nature make it appear as a settlement in its own right.

A large bluff, Grassy Point, lies between Broad Bay and the harbourside settlements of Company Bay and Macandrew Bay to the west. The bluff is skirted by Portobello Road, the road which winds around the southeastern shore of the harbour between inner Dunedin and Portobello,  to the northeast of Broad Bay, and by the Otago Harbour Cycleway, which runs alongside it. The Camp Road walking track connects Broad Bay with Larnach Castle, close to the ridge of the peninsula.

Broad Bay is situated on the shore of an aptly named wide bay (Broad Bay) and a smaller bay to the north east (Turnbulls Bay); between these lie a short peninsula (on which is sited the settlement's small historic cemetery), which terminates in the steep, finger-like headland of Yellowhead. The distinctive peak of Harbour Cone forms a backdrop to the settlement as seen from the harbour.

The settlement is home to the heritage-listed Fletcher House, constructed in 1909 and restored in 1992, the first house by Fletcher Construction founder Sir James Fletcher.

These settlements have a strong arts community, with many of their residents connected in some way with the visual or performing arts.

Demographics

It had a population of 564 at the 2018 New Zealand census, an increase of 9 people (1.6%) since the 2013 census, and a decrease of 6 people (−1.1%) since the 2006 census. There were 249 households. There were 282 males and 285 females, giving a sex ratio of 0.99 males per female, with 96 people (17.0%) aged under 15 years, 57 (10.1%) aged 15 to 29, 288 (51.1%) aged 30 to 64, and 120 (21.3%) aged 65 or older.

Ethnicities were 93.6% European/Pākehā, 8.0% Māori, 1.6% Pacific peoples, 3.7% Asian, and 2.7% other ethnicities (totals add to more than 100% since people could identify with multiple ethnicities).

Although some people objected to giving their religion, 66.0% had no religion, 22.3% were Christian, 0.5% were Buddhist and 3.7% had other religions.

Of those at least 15 years old, 204 (43.6%) people had a bachelor or higher degree, and 51 (10.9%) people had no formal qualifications. The employment status of those at least 15 was that 216 (46.2%) people were employed full-time, 90 (19.2%) were part-time, and 15 (3.2%) were unemployed.

Broad Bay-Portobello statistical area

Broad Bay-Portobello had a population of 1,155 at the 2018 New Zealand census, an increase of 81 people (7.5%) since the 2013 census, and an increase of 84 people (7.8%) since the 2006 census. There were 483 households. There were 582 males and 573 females, giving a sex ratio of 1.02 males per female. The median age was 47.9 years (compared with 37.4 years nationally), with 204 people (17.7%) aged under 15 years, 117 (10.1%) aged 15 to 29, 597 (51.7%) aged 30 to 64, and 237 (20.5%) aged 65 or older.

Ethnicities were 94.3% European/Pākehā, 10.1% Māori, 2.1% Pacific peoples, 3.1% Asian, and 1.8% other ethnicities (totals add to more than 100% since people could identify with multiple ethnicities).

The proportion of people born overseas was 25.2%, compared with 27.1% nationally.

Although some people objected to giving their religion, 66.2% had no religion, 22.9% were Christian, 0.5% were Buddhist and 3.9% had other religions.

Of those at least 15 years old, 381 (40.1%) people had a bachelor or higher degree, and 105 (11.0%) people had no formal qualifications. The median income was $34,300, compared with $31,800 nationally. 171 people (18.0%) earned over $70,000 compared to 17.2% nationally. The employment status of those at least 15 was that 459 (48.3%) people were employed full-time, 168 (17.7%) were part-time, and 27 (2.8%) were unemployed.

Education
Broad Bay School is a state co-educational primary school for year 1 to 8 children, with a roll of  students as of  The school opened in 1877.

References

Suburbs of Dunedin
Otago Peninsula
Populated places in Otago
Bays of Otago